The Alabama–Ole Miss football rivalry is an American college football rivalry between the Alabama Crimson Tide and Ole Miss Rebels. They are charter members of the Southeastern Conference (SEC), and both have competed in the SEC West since 1992.

The rivalry dates back to 1894, when Ole Miss defeated Alabama in Jackson, Mississippi. Currently, Alabama leads Ole Miss 54-10-2. The most recent Ole Miss victory was in 2015. The game now alternates between the two respective campuses. Contests in odd-numbered years are played in Tuscaloosa, Alabama, and even-numbered years in Oxford, Mississippi.

Notable games
1964 Sugar Bowl: In the only meeting in series history played outside of Alabama or Mississippi, #8 Alabama upset #7 Ole Miss 12–7 behind four field goals by kicker Tim Davis. Played at the end of the 1963 season, this game is notable for being the coldest Sugar Bowl in history, as snow plows were used to clear the Tulane Stadium field prior to the game. It was the first meeting of the two programs since 1944, and junior quarterback Joe Namath did not play, as he was suspended on December 9 for the remainder of the season.

1969: In what is often erroneously referred to as the first prime time regular season football game in history, #20 Ole Miss traveled to Legion Field in Birmingham to face #15 Alabama.  A dazzling offensive shootout ensues, highlighted by the play of Ole Miss quarterback Archie Manning.  Despite a 540-yard, 5 touchdown effort from Manning, Alabama emerged victorious 33–32 after a last minute touchdown pass by quarterback Scott Hunter.  The game has been referred to as among the greatest in college football history.

1988: Ole Miss stunned #12 Alabama 22–12 in Tuscaloosa, the Rebels' first-ever road victory in the series.  This game is known as "The Brick Bowl", due to a claim made by then-Alabama head coach Bill Curry that a brick was thrown through his office's window following the loss.

1989: Following Ole Miss' upset victory the year before, the Rebels hopped out to a 21–0 lead over #13 Alabama in Jackson, MS.  The Crimson Tide then scored 62 unanswered points en route to a 62–27 victory.  The 21-point comeback still stands as the largest in Alabama football history.

1998: This was the first overtime game in series history, with Alabama emerging victorious 20–17.  It was the first overtime win in Alabama football history, as well as the first overtime loss in Ole Miss football history.

2006: In 2006, Alabama beat the Rebels in an overtime thriller. In overtime, Ole Miss made a 37-yard field goal, but Alabama scored a touchdown on a pass to Le'Ron McClain to win the game 26–23.

2007: Alabama beat Ole Miss in Oxford by scoring 10 unanswered points to win the game 27–24, amidst controversial rulings from the officials. It was Alabama's fifth consecutive victory over the Rebels.

2014: In 2014, #1 Alabama came into Oxford as a 6-point favorite taking on #11 Ole Miss. Alabama led 14–3 at the half, but were held to only 3 points in the second half. Late in the fourth quarter, Ole Miss scored a go-ahead touchdown, but missed the PAT, leaving the score at 23–17. Alabama drove to Ole Miss 32 yard line, before Blake Sims threw an interception to Senquez Golson with 37 seconds left.  This was Ole Miss' first victory over Alabama since 2003, snapping a 10-game losing streak in the series. Due to sanctions, this win was vacated in 2019 due to the use of ineligible players.

2015: #2 Alabama sought revenge for the previous season's defeat, but #15 Ole Miss shot out to a 30–10 lead late in the third quarter.  Alabama quickly closed the gap to 30–24 less than three minutes into the fourth.  Ole Miss then scored 13 unanswered to extend their lead to 43–24, but had to fight off another Crimson Tide rally to secure a 43–37 upset victory.  Alabama committed 5 turnovers in this game, the most under head coach Nick Saban.  It was the first time in school history that Ole Miss had beaten Alabama in consecutive seasons and just the second time that the Rebels had won in Tuscaloosa. This would be the Crimson Tide's only loss that season as they went on to win the College Football Playoff national championship.

2016: #19 Ole Miss seemed to be on track for an unprecedented third-straight win over the top-ranked Crimson Tide, leading 24–3 with less than 2:47 left to play in the first half.  Alabama then scored 24 unanswered points to take a 27–24 lead midway through the third quarter.  Late in the fourth quarter, the Tide had extended its lead to 48–30 before Ole Miss scored twice in rapid succession to cut the deficit to five points with just under three minutes left.  Alabama was able to run out the clock, preserving a wild 48–43 victory and ending the Rebels' school record two game winning streak in the series.  The 21-point comeback tied the 1989 Alabama-Ole Miss game for the largest comeback in Alabama football history.

2020: Following three consecutive blowouts by the Crimson Tide, Ole Miss, under first-year head coach Lane Kiffin, sought to keep the game within reach. Both schools traded touchdowns throughout the first half and entered halftime tied at 21. Quarterbacks Matt Corral of the Rebels and Mac Jones of the Tide continued leading long scoring drives throughout the third quarter; no team led by more than a touchdown until late in the fourth, when a 14-yard touchdown run by wide receiver DeVonta Smith put Alabama up by 11. The Tide would hang on to win 63-48 in what became the highest-scoring game in the history of the rivalry.

Game results

See also 
 List of NCAA college football rivalry games

Notes

References

College football rivalries in the United States
Alabama Crimson Tide football
Ole Miss Rebels football